Phyllonorycter celtifoliella is a moth of the family Gracillariidae. It is known from Illinois, Kentucky, Ohio, West Virginia, Florida, Georgia, Maryland and Texas in the United States.

The larvae feed on Celtis species, including Celtis occidentalis. They mine the leaves of their host plant. The mine has the form of a tentiform mine on the underside of the leaf. The mine, lies between two veins and is somewhat variable in shape. The pupa is suspended in a few silken threads.

References

External links
Phyllonorycter at microleps.org
mothphotographersgroup

celtifoliella
Moths of North America
Moths described in 1871